Matthew Reese Carson (born July 1, 1981) is an American former professional baseball outfielder. He has played in Major League Baseball (MLB) for the Oakland Athletics, Minnesota Twins and Cleveland Indians.

Prior to playing professionally, he attended Yucaipa High School and then Brigham Young University (BYU).

Collegiate career
At BYU, he majored in mechanical engineering and was named to the Mountain West Conference All-Tournament Team in his freshman season, which was also the event's inaugural year. In 2000, he played collegiate summer baseball with the Hyannis Mets of the Cape Cod Baseball League, and returned to the league in 2001 to play for the Brewster Whitecaps.

Professional career

New York Yankees

Carson was drafted by the New York Yankees in the fifth round of the 2002 Major League Baseball Draft. He spent the next season with the Battle Creek Yankees, hitting .259 with 11 home runs and 100 strikeouts in 119 games. In 2004, he played for the Battle Creek Yankees and Tampa Yankees, hitting a combined .271 with 15 home runs and 111 strikeouts in 132.

Carson split the 2005 season between Tampa and the Trenton Thunder, batting .238 with nine home runs in 112 games. In 2006, he played for those two teams again, hitting .248 with ten home runs in 69 games. He spent all of 2007 with Trenton, hitting .248 with 16 home runs, and in 2008 he played for Trenton and the Scranton/Wilkes-Barre Yankees, hitting .285 with 15 home runs in 111 games.

Oakland Athletics

Carson signed as a minor league free agent with the Oakland Athletics on December 1, 2008, and played with the Sacramento River Cats. He had a career year, hitting .264 with 25 home runs and 77 RBI, and was subsequently called up to the major leagues.

Carson made his major league debut on September 18, 2009, against the Cleveland Indians. In his first game, he struck out twice in three at-bats. His first hit was a single to right field off of Tomo Ohka of the Indians the following day.

Three days later, he hit his first major league home run in the 9th inning off of the Texas Rangers' Eddie Guardado. Carson was outrighted to the minors after the 2010 season. In 46 games over two seasons, he hit .200 with five homers and 14 RBI.

Tampa Bay Rays
He was purchased by the Tampa Bay Rays from the Athletics on August 1, 2011, and briefly played with the Durham Bulls, where he hit .250 in 22 games. After the 2011 season, he elected free agency.

Minnesota Twins
He signed a minor league contract with the Minnesota Twins on November 17, 2011. He spent most of the season in AAA with the Rochester Red Wings, hitting .282 with 14 homers and 53 RBI. He also appeared in 26 games for the Twins, hitting .227.

Cleveland Indians
After signing with the Cleveland Indians on November 19, 2012, Carson went on to appear in 20 games for Cleveland, collecting seven hits, including one homer, in 11 at-bats. On September 19, he hit a walk-off single against the Houston Astros.  After the season, Carson was non-tendered by the Indians, making him a free agent. He was re-signed to a minor league deal on December 13, 2013.

Los Angeles Dodgers
In January 2015, he signed a minor league contract with the Los Angeles Dodgers, that included an invitation to major league spring training. He was assigned to the AAA Oklahoma City Dodgers.

Oakland Athletics (second stint)

The Dodgers traded him back to the Athletics on May 8, 2015. Carson was assigned to the Triple-A Nashville Sounds. He was released on June 20.

References

External links

Living people
1981 births
Baseball players from California
Oakland Athletics players
Minnesota Twins players
Cleveland Indians players
BYU Cougars baseball players
Águilas Cibaeñas players
American expatriate baseball players in the Dominican Republic
Staten Island Yankees players
Battle Creek Yankees players
Tampa Yankees players
Trenton Thunder players
Scranton/Wilkes-Barre Yankees players
Sacramento River Cats players
Durham Bulls players
Estrellas Orientales players
Rochester Red Wings players
Columbus Clippers players
Oklahoma City Dodgers players
Nashville Sounds players
Brewster Whitecaps players
Hyannis Harbor Hawks players
People from Yucaipa, California